Frank Götzke (born 18 June 1969) is a German engineer and technology manager. His creations include the Bugatti Veyron, Bugatti Chiron and Bugatti Bolide. He is also well known for his metallic 3D printing creations. He is considered to be a pioneer in the field of carbon-fiber-reinforced structural and functional parts, which are manufactured with resin infiltration processes. Götzke has been a member of the Volkswagen Group since 1995, and he has worked for its super car brand Bugatti since 2001.

Career 

After graduating from high school in 1989, Frank Götzke spent his military service at Stöberhai, a listening outpost of the German Armed Forces. After that, he studied mechanical engineering at the Technical University Carolo Wilhelmina zu Braunschweig. He specialized in the field of machine tools and manufacturing technologies, and he completed his studies in 1994.

He began working in the consulting business at IAP GmbH where he primarily dealt with plant engineering projects and organizational planning in the fields of rail vehicle construction, the aviation industries, and constructional machinery industries. He was responsible for the planning and development of the flexibly automated Lost-Foam, casting plants at Volkswagen Hanover. 

In 1995, he joined Volkswagen Group's department of Technical Development where he has held various leadership positions. This era marks his contact to the former Volkswagen CEO Ferdinand Piëch, who employed Götzke as one of the first persons in the newly founded hypercar brand Bugatti in June 2001. In the following years, Götzke led the department of car development. Later, he led Bugatti's department of chassis development until September 2006.

Currently, he is the head of special projects and new technologies. He is responsible for the key activities of materials and manufacturing processes, calculation and simulation, patent and innovation systems, and the pre-development of entire vehicles and its components.

Fields of activity 
In addition to the creation of the basic concepts of three modern Bugatti vehicles (Veyron, Chiron, and Bolide), Götzke is behind many different technological achievements:

 Development and series applications of parts manufactured by Tailored-Fiberplacement processes
 CSiC high-performance brake discs in a series application for automotive purposes
 Application of native spider silk for both automotive and medical purposes and in cooperation with the MHH
 Carbon based nano-tubes in cooperation with the Leibnitz Institute for Theoretical Solid-state Physics
 Lightweight construction pushrod made out of carbon fiber compound
 Caliper made out of titanium as the biggest titanium-3D-printing part in the world
 Closed development and manufacturing environment for 3D-printing parts
 Biggest hybrid functional assembly consisting of 3D-printed titanium combined with carbon fiber compound parts manufactured with maximum temperature bismaleimide-resin

References

External links 

 Götzke and the Bugatti 3D Printed Caliper
 Götzke in an interview with the Managermagazin in case of the Bugatti Veyron Super Sport
 Conference programme for the Ruhrsymposium 2019 in Duisburg from Prof. Ferdinand Dudenhöffer
 Quotation of Frank Götzke in case of the Bugatti Titanium-Caliper

German automotive engineers
Technical University of Braunschweig alumni
1969 births
Living people